Alexander (1760–1780) was a Georgian royal prince (batonishvili) of the Bagrationi dynasty of the Kingdom of Imereti and the only son of King Solomon I of Imereti by his second wife Mariam née Dadiani.

In 1778, Alexander led a revolt against his own father, which gained support from many influential noble families, such as the Nizharadze, and the catholicos Maxim II Abashidze. Solomon emerged victorious, forcing many of the rebels into exile in the neighboring Georgian kingdom of Kartli and Kakheti, whose ruler Heraclius II had indicated sympathy to the attempted coup. Alexander eventually reconciled with Solomon, but died before his father, leaving the issue of succession unclear and open to rivaling claims, after Solomon's death in 1784, from Solomon's cousin David II, his nephew David (Solomon II), and George. The latter was Alexander's natural son of his marriage (1779) with Princess Darejan née Tsulukidze, which was not recognized as legitimate by the church. Alexander had no issue of his previous marriages with Salome, a daughter of Prince George of Georgia (the future king George XII; January 3, 1777), and with a daughter of Prince Paata Abashidze (1778).

Issue
 Prince George of Imereti

Ancestry

References 

1760 births
1780 deaths
Bagrationi dynasty of the Kingdom of Imereti
Georgian princes